Aletris bracteata (bracted colicroot)  is a plant species native to southern Florida (Monroe and Miami-Dade Counties) and to the Bahamas (Andros and Abaco Islands). It grows in the Everglades and other wet areas very close to sea level. Some hybridization between this species and the yellow-flowered A. lutea has been noted.

Aletris bracteata is a perennial herb  up to 60 cm tall, spreading by means of underground rhizomes. Flowers are white, about 7 mm long.

References

Nartheciaceae
Flora of Florida
Flora of the Bahamas
Plants described in 1902
Flora without expected TNC conservation status